Van Son is a Dutch toponymic surname meaning "from/of Son", a town in North Brabant. People with the surname include:

Adrian Vanson (né Adriaen van Son; died c.1602), Dutch-born court portrait painter to James VI of Scotland
Daniël van Son (born 1994), Dutch football winger
Jan Frans van Son (1658–1701), Flemish still life painter, son of Joris
Jens van Son (born 1987), Dutch football midfielder
Joris van Son (1623–1667), Flemish still life painter, father of Jan Frans
Jos van Son (1893–1956), Dutch football forward
 (1922–1986), Dutch KVP politician
 (born 1953), Dutch energy trader, founder and honorary president of EFET

See also
Van Son (cyclist), Cambodian cyclist
, river in southeast France
Vân Sơn (disambiguation), several communes in Vietnam

References

Dutch-language surnames
Toponymic surnames